Hotel Grand Chancellor is a hotel chain that operates throughout Australia and New Zealand.

History
The Hotel Grand Chancellor, Christchurch was severely damaged in the February 2011 Christchurch earthquake, and was believed to be in an imminent state of collapse. The hotel at 26-storeys was the tallest building in Christchurch.

The hotel was searched and no survivors or bodies found. Demolition began in December 2011 and was completed by May 2012.

Hotels

Open
Australia
Adelaide
Adelaide (branded as The Chancellor on Currie)
Brisbane
Hobart
Launceston
Melbourne
Townsville
New Zealand
Auckland City
Wellington (branded as James Cook Hotel Grand Chancellor)

Closed
Australia

 Palm Cove

New Zealand
Christchurch

References

Hotel chains in Australia
Grand Hotels International